LRG Racing was established in 2006 by Lawrence R. Goldfarb, the CEO of LRG Capital Group.  The LRG Racing team competes primarily in the American Federation of Motorcyclists (AFM), and exhibitions in other racing clubs.  The LRG Racing team will compete in the Formula II, Formula III, 600 Production, and the 600 Superbike classes of the AFM.  The team is based out of Larkspur, California.

LRG Racing Team

Elaine Ou
 Manager, AFM #494
 Hometown: San Gabriel, CA
 Bike: 1998 Honda RS 125
 Age: 25, 2 years racing experience
 Class: Formula II, Formula III

Paul Yoshimune
 AFM # 650
 Bike: 2000 Suzuki GSX-R600
 Age: 37, 5 years racing experience
 Class: 600 Production, 600 Superbike

LRG Racing 2007 Schedule

 March 24 & 25 at Buttonwillow Raceway Park
April 28 & 29 at Infineon Raceway
 May 25 – 27 at Infineon Raceway
 July 7–8 at Thunderhill Park
 August 18 and 19 at Infineon Raceway
 September 8 & 9 at Thunderhill Park
 September 28 – 30 at Infineon Raceway
 October 20 – 21 at Buttonwillow Raceway Park

LRG Racing Sponsors

LRG Capital Group
Collette Erickson Farmer & O’Neill LLP 
Lautze & Lautze CPA's & Financial Advisors 
Virgin Limo 
Network Gear Exchange, Inc.  
Keigwins@ the Track

References

External links
Official Web Site of LRG Racing
AFM Official Web Site
AFM History Site

Motorcycle racing teams
Motorcycle racing teams established in 2006
2006 establishments in California
Motorcycle racing teams disestablished in 2007
2007 disestablishments in California